Kang Yoon-sung (born 1 July 1997) is a South Korean footballer who plays as midfielder for Gimcheon Sangmu in K League 1.

Career
Kang joined K League Challenge side Daejeon Citizen in January 2016.

Honours

International
South Korea U23
AFC U-23 Championship: 2020

References

External links 

1997 births
Living people
Association football midfielders
South Korean footballers
Daejeon Hana Citizen FC players
Jeju United FC players
Gimcheon Sangmu FC players
K League 1 players
K League 2 players
Footballers at the 2020 Summer Olympics
Olympic footballers of South Korea